Jonas Siegenthaler (born 6 May 1997) is a Swiss professional ice hockey defenceman for the New Jersey Devils of the National Hockey League (NHL). He was drafted in the 2nd round, 57th overall in 2015 by the Washington Capitals, who he previously played for until he was traded to the Devils.

Prior to playing in North America, Siegenthaler played for his hometown ZSC Lions of the Switzerland NL. With ZSC Lions he was part of the team that won the Swiss Cup in 2016.

Playing career
Siegenthaler made his National League A debut playing with ZSC Lions during the 2013–14 NLA season. He was rated as a top prospect, projected as a possible first round selection in the 2015 NHL Entry Draft, and was selected 57th overall by the Washington Capitals.

On 30 July 2015, Siegenthaler was signed to a three-year entry-level contract with the Capitals. Siegenthaler remained with the ZSC Lions on loan for the 2015–16 season in order to further develop. During the season Siegenthaler played with Future U.S NHL star forward Auston Matthews, who following the season would be selected 1st overall by the Toronto Maple Leafs in the 2016 NHL entry draft. In 40 NLA games with the Lions, Siegenthaler contributed 8 points (3 Goals 5 assists) from the blueline before he played in 4 games as the team suffered a first-round defeat in the post-season. He also played 5 games in 2015-16 Swiss ice hockey Cup, which ZSC Zions beat HC Lausanne 4-1 in the final. On 16 March 2016, with the Lions season and his loan period at an end, he was reassigned to the Capitals AHL affiliate, the Hershey Bears.

He also spent the 2016–17 season with the ZSC Lions. After being knocked out with the Lions in the NLA quarter finals, he returned to the Hershey Bears in mid-March 2017.

The Capitals recalled Siegenthaler from Hershey on 8 November 2018, to play against the Columbus Blue Jackets the next night at home in his first NHL game. Veteran Capitals defencemen Brooks Orpik (injured reserve) and John Carlson (day-to-day) were both unavailable to play. Siegenthaler scored his first NHL point on 14 December 2018 in a 6–5 win over the Carolina Hurricanes, gaining the primary assist on a goal by Alexander Ovechkin.

During the 2020–21 season, while approaching the NHL trade deadline, Siegenthaler was traded by the Capitals to the New Jersey Devils in exchange for a conditional third-round pick in the 2021 NHL Entry Draft on 11 April 2021. On 9 July 2021, Siegenthaler signed a two-year, $2.25 million contract extension to remain with the Devils. On 26 July 2022, the Devils and Siegenthaler agreed to a five-year, $17 million contract extension.

Personal life
Siegenthaler's father is from Switzerland, while his mother is from Thailand. He is the first known NHL player of Thai descent.

International play
Siegenthaler competed with Team Switzerland at the 2013, 2014 and 2015 IIHF World U18 Championships. His outstanding play was recognized when he was named to the 2015 U18 WJC All-Star Team. He was also selected to participate at the 2014 Ivan Hlinka Memorial Tournament.

He was chosen to skate, as a 17-year-old, with the Swiss U20 squad at the 2015 World Junior Ice Hockey Championship.

Siegenthaler played his last WJC for Switzerland in 2017 where he tallied 6 points (1 goal and 5 assists) in 5 games and was Switzerland's most used player with over 25 minutes of ice-time per game.

Career statistics

Regular season and playoffs

International

Awards and honours

References

External links

1997 births
Living people
GCK Lions players
Hershey Bears players
New Jersey Devils players
Swiss ice hockey defencemen
Swiss people of Thai descent
Washington Capitals draft picks
Washington Capitals players
ZSC Lions players
Ice hockey people from Zürich